Vostochny (masculine), Vostochnaya (feminine), or Vostochnoye (neuter) is the name of several inhabited localities in Russia.

Urban localities
Vostochny, Kirov Oblast, an urban-type settlement in Omutninsky District of Kirov Oblast

Rural localities
Vostochny, Kemerovo Oblast, a settlement in Mezhdurechensky District of Kemerovo Oblast
 , a village in Sakhalin Oblast
Vostochny, Sverdlovsk Oblast, a settlement in Sverdlovsk Oblast
Vostochny, name of several other rural localities
Vostochnaya, Krasnodar Krai, a stanitsa in Ust-Labinsky District of Krasnodar Krai
Vostochnaya, name of several other rural localities
Vostochnoye, Astrakhan Oblast, a selo in Ikryaninsky District of Astrakhan Oblast
Vostochnoye, name of several other rural localities

See also
Vostok